Robert Cleon Spies (17 February 1891 – 22 October 1982) was a German tennis player. He competed in two events at the 1912 Summer Olympics in Sweden.

References

External links
 

1891 births
1982 deaths
German male tennis players
Olympic tennis players of Germany
Tennis players at the 1912 Summer Olympics
Tennis players from Moscow
Emigrants from the Russian Empire to Germany